Strajane is a village in the municipality of Gostivar, North Macedonia.

Demographics
As of the 2021 census, Strajane had 54 residents with the following ethnic composition:
Albanians 46
Persons for whom data are taken from administrative sources 8

According to the 2002 census, the village had a total of 307 inhabitants. Ethnic groups in the village include:

Albanians 307

References

External links

Villages in Gostivar Municipality
Albanian communities in North Macedonia